André Terrasson (1669 – 25 April 1723) was a French Oratorian preacher.

Life

He was born at Lyon, the eldest son of a councillor of the Lyon presidial (court of justice). Gaspard Terrasson was his brother. Entering the Congregation of the Oratory, he devoted himself to preaching, where he gained a high reputation. 

He preached the Lenten sermons of 1717 before Louis XIV, next at the Court of Lorraine, and later twice in the metropolitan church of Paris; the last of these series broke down his health and led to his death at Paris.

Works
About fifty of his discourses, mostly delivered as Lenten lectures, are preserved, and were published at Paris (4 vols., 1726, 1736).

References

Attribution
 The entry cites:
Cursay, Mémoires sur les savants de la famille de Terrasson (Trévoux, 1761); 
Nouvelles ecclésiastiques (1736, 1744); 
Supplément au nécrologe des plus célèbres défenseurs de la vérité (s. l., 1763), 120; 
Candel, Les prédicateurs français dans la première moitié du XVIIIe siècle (Paris, 1904); 
Féret, La Faculté de théologie de Paris, Epoque moderne, VI (Paris, 1909), 144.

1669 births
1723 deaths
Clergy from Lyon
17th-century French Roman Catholic priests
18th-century French Roman Catholic priests